Zimbabwe Achievers Awards (Z.A.A.) also referred to as Zim Achievers Awards is an awards ceremony that seeks to recognise Zimbabweans based in the diaspora for outstanding and notable achievements. Among the awards recipients include Hollywood actress Danai Gurira of The Walking Dead TV Series, and Black Panther;  Chipo Chung as well as Luthuli Dhlamini of South Africa's TV Series Generations.

History

The Zimbabwe Achievers Awards (Z.A.A.) was founded in 2010 by Conrad Mwanza, a Zimbabwean businessman who is based in the United Kingdom. The ZAA currently has four editions which are the UK Edition, the USA Edition, the Australian Edition and the South African Edition.

Over the years, the ceremony has had several different sponsors including Steward Bank, Food World, Mukuru, Fastjet, Impala Car Rental and Hamilton Insurance. The most recent partnership was with WorldRemit.

London Fintech Company, WorldRemit were announced as the global partner for ZAA International in March 2018. They headlined the event in 2018 which honoured the achievements of Zimbabweans in the UK. The company also partnered to headline the South African, USA and Australian editions.

2018 UK Edition

The 2018 Z.A.A awards hosted Tsitsi Masiyiwa, the wife of Zimbabwe's first billionaire businessman Strive Masiyiwa. Tsitsi Masiyiwa was the keynote speaker of the UK Edition on 26 May 2018 in London

Awards categories

Business Of The Year
Male Entrepreneur Of The Year
Female Entrepreneur Of The Year
Professional Of The Year
Community Champion Of The Year
Music Video Of The Year
Music Artist Of The Year
International Gospel Artist Of The Year
Male Personality Of The Year
Female Personality Of The Year
Sports Personality Of The Year
Fashion Designer Of The Year
Event Of The Year
People's Choice 
Break Through Award
Young Achiever Of The Year

Top awards recipients

Strive Masiyiwa
Tsitsi Masiyiwa
Patrick Mavros
Tongayi Chirisa
Danai Gurira
Chipo Chung
Luthuli Dlamini
Chiedza Mhende
Ernest Ndlovu
Jah Seed
Jah Prayzah
Buffalo Souljah
Nadia Nakai
Oliver Mtukudzi
Thomas Mapfumo
Brian Nhira
Tinashe
Dj Edu
Farai Gundan
Taponeswa Mavunga
Petina Gappah
Hugh Masekela
Derick Chisora
Khama Billiat
Esrom Nyandoro
Kirsty Coventry
Hillzy
Takesure Zamar Ncube
Kazz A.K.A Mr Boomslang
Zimcelebs

References

External links

Zimbabwean awards